Claudio Licciardello (born 11 January 1986 in Catania) is a track and field sprinter from Italy, who specializes in the 400 metres. His personal best time is 45.25 seconds, achieved in the heats at the 2008 Olympics in Beijing.

Biography
At the 2009 European Indoor Championships he won the silver medal in the 400 metres, and a gold medal in the 4 x 400 metres relay together with teammates Jacopo Marin, Matteo Galvan and Domenico Rao. He also competed at the 2004 World Junior Championships, the 2006 European Championships and the 2008 Olympic Games without reaching the final.

Achievements

See also
 Italian all-time lists - 400 metres
 Italy national relay team

References

External links
 

1986 births
Living people
Italian male sprinters
Athletes (track and field) at the 2008 Summer Olympics
Olympic athletes of Italy
Sportspeople from Catania
Athletics competitors of Fiamme Gialle
Italian Athletics Championships winners